The Hand County Courthouse and Jail, located at 415 W. First Ave. in Miller, South Dakota, was listed on the National Register of Historic Places in 1994.  The Art Deco courthouse was built in 1927.

The jail and residence is also built in Art Deco style, and was built in 1931 of Bedford stone.

References

		
Courthouses on the National Register of Historic Places in South Dakota
Art Deco architecture in South Dakota
Government buildings completed in 1927
Hand County, South Dakota
Courthouses in South Dakota